Gérard Pesson (born 17 January 1958 in Torteron) is a French composer. Pesson studied musicology at the Sorbonne and is the composer of a number of award-winning works.

Works
 Affûts pour 4 percussions (2001)
 Aggravations et final pour orchestre (2002)
 Berceuses à bas voltage (4) pour grand orchestre (1998)
 Branle du Poitou pour piano et 8 instruments (1997)
 Bruissant divisé pour violon et violoncelle (1998)
 Butterfly le nom, scène lyrique pour soprano, chœur d'hommes et petit orchestre (1995)
 Butterfly's Note book pour piano (1995/98)
 Cantate égale pays n°1 (Jachère aidant) pour voix, ensemble et électronique (2010)
 Cantate égale pays n°2 (God's Grandeur) pour voix, ensemble et électronique (2010)
 Cantate égale pays n°3 (Gd Mmré) pour voix, ensemble et électronique (2010)
 Cassation pour clarinette, trio à cordes et piano (2003)
 Carmagnole pour ensemble (2015)
 Chansons (5) pour mezzo-soprano et 5 instruments (1999)
 Chants populaires pour chœur (2008)
 Colophon (ritournelle à quatre voix sur une corde) pour violoncelle (2007)
 Contra me (miserere) pour ensemble vocal et instrumental (2002)
 De Loup & d'estoc (bergeries sur le fil) pour 2 violoncelles (2007)
 Dispositions furtives pour 2 pianos amplifiés (1988)
 Ecrit à Qinzhou pour récitant(e) et piano (1994)
 Études pour orgue baroque (3) (1998)
 Folies d'Espagne pour piano (1997)
 Forever Valley, opéra pour 7 chanteurs, comédienne et 6 instruments (1999/00)
 Fureur contre informe pour un tombeau d'Anatole pour trio à cordes (1998)
 Gigue pour 6 percussions (2001)
 In nomine pour 7 instruments (2001)
 Kein deutscher Himmel (transcription de l'Adagietto de la 5e Symphonie de Gustav Mahler) pour chœur mixte (1996/97)
 La Lumière n'a pas de bras pour nous porter pour piano (1994/95)
 La vita è come l'albero di Natale (d'après un fragment de Claude Debussy) pour violon et piano (1992)
 Le Gel, par jeu pour sextuor (1991)
 Le Grand Quinconce pour grand orchestre (1988)
 Les Chants Faëz pour piano principal et 11 instruments (1986)
 Mélodies carthaginoises (2) pour baryton et piano (1992)
 Mes béatitudes pour piano, violon, alto et violoncelle (1994/95)
My Creative Method pour alto (2014)
 Nebenstück (d'après la 4e Ballade op.10 de Johannes Brahms) pour clarinette et quatuor à cordes (1998)
 Neige bagatelle pour guitare, violoncelle et piano (2002)
 Ne pas oublier coq rouge dans jour craquelé (moments Proust) pour violon, violoncelle et piano (2010)
 Nocturnes en quatuor pour clarinette, violon, violoncelle et piano (1987)
 Non sapremo mai di questo mi (d'après un fragment de Mozart) pour flûte, violon et piano (1991)
 Panorama, particolari e licenza (d'après Harold en Italie d'Hector Berlioz) pour alto, voix d'alto et neuf instruments (2006)
 Paraphernalia pour 2 altos (2009)
 Pastorale pour soli, chœur et orchestre (2006)
 Peigner le vif pour alto et accordéon (2007)
 Petites études mélancoliques (3) pour piano (1991)
 Poèmes de Sandro Penna (5)  (1991/92)
 Preuve par la neige pour chœur (2004)
 Purple programme  (1994)
 Quatuor à cordes n°1 Respirez ne respirez plus pour 2 violons, alto et violoncelle (1993)
 Quatuor à cordes n°2 Bitume (sérénade chevauchée) pour 2 violons, alto et violoncelle (2008)
 Rebus (pro rebus Harry Vogti)  (1999)
 Récréations françaises pour sextuor (1993/95)
 Rescousses pour orchestre (2005)
Sincère sur le mur atonal pour saxophone, violon et violoncelle (2014)
 Sonate à quatre pour 2 flûtes à bec, violon et violoncelle (1996)
 Sur-le-champ pour 4 chanteurs et 8 instruments (1994)
 Un peu de fièvre pour 12 instruments (1995)
 Vexierbilder Rom pour piano (1991/95)
 Vexierbilder II pour piano (2003)
 Wunderblock (Nebenstück II) pour accordéon et orchestre (2005)

References

1958 births
Living people
French composers